The 97th Airlift Squadron is a United States Air Force Reserve squadron, assigned to the 446th Operations Group, stationed at Joint Base Lewis-McChord, Washington.  It is a USAF Associate Unit of the active duty 4th Airlift Squadron, 62d Airlift Wing.

Overview
The squadron operates McDonnell Douglas C-17 Globemaster III aircraft supporting the United States Air Force global reach mission worldwide.

History

World War II
Activated in July 1943 as an I Troop Carrier Command Douglas C-47 Skytrain Squadron.  After training in the United States, at various bases,  sent to Baer Field, Indiana for final equipping with aircraft, personnel and other equipment.  Deployed to IX Troop Carrier Command in February 1944 during the build-up prior to the Invasion of France.

During the D-Day Invasion, the squadron  dropped paratroops of the 101st Airborne Division in Normandy, subsequently flying numerous missions to bring in reinforcements and needed supplies. During the airborne attack on The Netherlands (Operation Market Garden, September 1944), the squadron dropped paratroops, towed gliders, and flew resupply missions. Later participated in the invasion of southern France in August 1944. The squadron supported the 101st Airborne Division in the Battle of the Bulge by towing gliders full of supplies near Bastogne on 27 December 1944. In addition, its units participated in the air assault across the Rhine River in early 1945 (Operation Varsity) and later flew numerous freight missions to carry gasoline, food, medicine, and other supplies to allied ground forces during the Western Allied invasion of Germany in April 1945 near Wesel. The squadron also hauled food, clothing, medicine, gasoline, ordnance equipment, and other supplies to the front lines and evacuated patients to rear zone hospitals. It  transported displaced persons from Germany to France and Belgium after V-E Day.   Remained in Europe during the summer of 1945, inactivating as part of the United States Air Forces in Europe, October 1945.

Reserve operations and mobilization for the Korean War
Reactivated in the reserve as a Curtiss C-46 Commando troop carrier squadron in Minneapolis, Minnesota during 1947.   Was federalized as a result of the Korean War in 1951, squadron personnel and aircraft being sent to active-duty units as fillers,  inactivated as an administrative unit a few days later.

Return to reserve operations
Reactivated after the Korean War as a reserve fighter-bomber squadron in 1952 initially equipped with North American F-51 Mustangs, later upgraded to Lockheed F-80 Shooting Star jet aircraft. Carried out theater transport operations and supported Air Force and Army units with troop carrier missions. Was activated during the 1962 Cuban Missile Crisis, carried Army units to South Florida in preparation of a possible invasion of Cuba. Returned Army personnel to home stations after situation was normalized and returned to reserve service.

The squadron flew airlift missions worldwide, including to Southeast Asia during the Vietnam War and to Southwest Asia during the Gulf War.  It has also participated in training exercises, some involving the dropping or landing of airborne troops.

The squadron has conducted worldwide airlift  including Supporting contingency operations in Panama, 1989–1990, and in southwest Asia, 1990–1991.

Campaigns and decorations
 Campaigns: World War II: Rome-Arno; Normandy; Northern France; Southern France; Rhineland; Ardennes-Alsace; Central Europe. Southwest Asia: Defense of Saudi Arabia; Liberation and Defense of Kuwait.
 Decorations: Distinguished Unit Citation: France, 6–7 June 1944. Air Force Outstanding Unit Awards: 23 December 1964 – 22 January 1965; 26 January 1968 – 1 June 1969; 1 July 1969 – 30 June 1970; 1 July 1973-30 June 1974; 1 September 1982 – 31 August 1984; 1 August 1990 – 31 July 1992. Republic of Vietnam Gallantry Cross with Palm, 1 April 1966 – 28 January 1973.

Lineage
 Constituted as the 97th Troop Carrier Squadron on 25 May 1943
 Activated on 1 July 1943
 Inactivated on 18 October 1945
 Activated in the reserve on 15 September 1947
 Redesignated 97th Troop Carrier Squadron, Medium on 27 June 1949
 Ordered to active duty on 1 May 1951
 Inactivated on 4 May 1951
 Redesignated 97th Fighter-Bomber Squadron on 26 May 1952
 Activated in the reserve on 15 June 1952
 Inactivated on 1 July 1957
 Redesignated 97th Troop Carrier Squadron, Medium on 24 October 1957
 Activated in the Reserve on 16 November 1957
 Ordered to active duty on 28 October 1962
 Relieved from active duty on 28 November 1962
 Redesignated 97th Air Transport Squadron, Heavy on 1 December 1965
 Redesignated 97th Military Airlift Squadron on 1 January 1966
 Ordered to active duty on 26 January 1968
 Relieved from active duty on 2 June 1969
 Redesignated 97th Military Airlift Squadron (Associate) on 25 July 1969
 Redesignated 97th Airlift Squadron (Associate) on 1 February 1992
 Redesignated 97th Airlift Squadron on 1 October 1994

Assignments
 440th Troop Carrier Group, 1 July 1943 – 18 October 1945
 440th Troop Carrier Group, 15 September 1947 – 4 May 1951
 440th Fighter-Bomber Group, 15 June 1952 – 1 July 1957
 440th Troop Carrier Group, 16 November 1957
 349th Troop Carrier Group, 25 March 1958
 349th Troop Carrier Wing, 14 April 1959
 941st Troop Carrier Group (later 941st Air Transport Group, 941st Military Airlift) Group, 11 February 1963
 939th Military Airlift Group, 25 July 1969
 446th Military Airlift Wing (later 446th Airlift Wing), 1 July 1973
 446th Operations Group, 1 August 1992 – present

Stations

 Baer Field, Indiana, 1 July 1943
 Sedalia Army Air Field, Missouri, 9 July 1943
 Alliance Army Air Field, Nebraska, 7 September 1943
 Pope Field, North Carolina, 4 January 1944
 Baer Field, Indiana, 14–21 February 1944
 RAF Bottesford (AAF-481), England, 8 March 1944
 RAF Exeter (AAF-463), England, 26 April 1944 (operated from Ombrone Airfield, Italy, 18 July–24 August 1944)
 Reims/Champagne Airfield (A-62), France, 13 September 1944

 Le Mans Airfield (A-35), France, 28 September 1944
 Orleans/Bricy Airfield (A-50), 4 November 1944 – 18 October 1945
 Wold-Chamberlain Field, Minnesota, 9 April 1947 – 4 May 1951
 Fort Snelling, Minnesota, 15 June 1952
 Minneapolis-St Paul International Airport, Minnesota, 8 January 1953 – 1 July 1957
 O'Hare International Airport, Illinois, 16 November 1957
 Paine Air Force Base, Washington, 25 March 1958
 McChord Air Force Base (later Joint Base Lewis-McChord), Washington, 9 November 1965 – present

Aircraft

 Aeronca L-3 Grasshopper (1943–1945)
 Douglas C-47 Skytrain (1943-1945, 1948)
 Douglas C-54 Skymaster (1943–1945)
 Consolidated C-109 Liberator Express (1943–1945)
 Curtiss C-46 Commando (1949–1951, 1952–1957)
 Beechcraft T-7 Navigator (1950–1951)
 Beechcraft T-11 Kansan (1947–1951)
 North American T-6 Texan (1948–1951, 1952–1955)
 North American F-51 Mustang (1953–1954)
 Lockheed F-80 Shooting Star (1954–1957)
 Lockheed T-33 T-Bird (1954–1957)
 Fairchild C-119 Flying Boxcar (1957–1965)
 Douglas C-124 Globemaster II (1965–1969)
 Lockheed C-141 Starlifter (1969–2003)
 McDonnell Douglas C-17 Globemaster III (2003–present)

References

 Notes

Bibliography

 
 
 
 
 
 

Military units and formations in Washington (state)
097
1943 establishments in Indiana